Septariyanto (born September 1, 1982) is an Indonesian footballer who plays for Sriwijaya F.C. in the Indonesia Super League.

References

1982 births
Living people
Indonesian Premier Division players
Liga 1 (Indonesia) players
PS Barito Putera players
Indonesian footballers
Association football midfielders